Pearson is an unincorporated community in Pottawatomie County, Oklahoma, United States. It is located just east of the U.S. Route 177/State Highway 3W - State Highway 59 junction.

Unincorporated communities in Pottawatomie County, Oklahoma
Unincorporated communities in Oklahoma